Marian Turowski (born 27 December 1964) is a Polish former cyclist. He competed in the team pursuit event at the 1988 Summer Olympics.

References

External links
 

1964 births
Living people
Polish male cyclists
Olympic cyclists of Poland
Cyclists at the 1988 Summer Olympics
People from Sobótka
Sportspeople from Lower Silesian Voivodeship